Miss South Africa 2020 was the 62nd edition of the Miss South Africa pageant. The final pageant was held on 24 October 2020 in The Table Bay Hotel, Cape Town, with a 2-hour live broadcast being simulcast on M-Net and Mzansi Magic. The pageant was also televised live on YouTube to audiences around the world.

Sasha-Lee Olivier of Gauteng crowned Shudufhadzo Musida of Limpopo as her successor at the end of the event. She will represent South Africa at Miss World 2021. Musida, being the winner, also received prizes in excess of 3 million rand, including a car and one-year free stay in the Miss South Africa official apartment, located in Sandton, Johannesburg. First runner-up Thato Mosehle received 250,000 rand and represented South Africa at Miss Supranational 2021, second runner-up Natasha Joubert received 100,000 rand and represented South Africa at Miss Universe 2020.

Results 
Color keys

Delegates 

The top ten finalists were revealed on 5 August.

Non-finalists

Top 15
The top fifteen was revealed on 24 June. The following five delegates did not advance to the top ten.

Top 35
The top 35 was announced on 11 June 2020. The following 20 delegates did not advance to the top fifteen.

Judges

Semifinals
The following four judges determined the 35 entrants who made it to the semifinals.
 Anele Mdoda – Radio jockey
 Bokang Montjane-Tshabalala – Miss South Africa 2010
 Liesl Laurie – Miss South Africa 2015
 Adè van Heerden – Miss South Africa 2017

Finals
 Zozibini Tunzi - Miss South Africa 2019 and Miss Universe 2019
 Anele Mdoda - Award-winning television personality and radio jockey
Peggy-Sue Khumalo - Miss South Africa 1996 and Chief Executive of Standard Bank Wealth South Africa
Leandie du Randt - Actress, entrepreneur and motivational speaker
Kim Engelbrecht - Actress

References

2020
2020 beauty pageants
2020 in South Africa
October 2020 events in South Africa